Hercules Returns is a 1993 Australian comedy film directed by David Parker, starring David Argue, Michael Carman, Bruce Spence and Mary Coustas. The film has a cult following in Australia and other countries. It has been released in DVD format (Region 4, format 16:9).

It was the first feature directed by David Parker although he had written and produced a number of other films.

Synopsis
Film buff Brad McBain (Argue), a frustrated employee of Australia's largest cinema chain, The Kent Corporation, quits his job and decides to set up and re-open the Picture Palace, a palatial disused cinema in St Kilda, Melbourne, to show classic old films in the old-fashioned style.

As a gimmick he chooses the last picture that the cinema featured, Samson and His Mighty Challenge (an Italian film, originally released in 1964 as Ercole, Sansone, Maciste e Ursus: gli invincibili). When the print arrives at the grand gala opening they discover that it is in unsubtitled Italian, and Brad suspects that his old boss, Sir Michael Kent (Carman), has in some way sabotaged the delivery so that McBain can fail at his achievement and keep Kent's business running successfully.

This calls for desperate measures and McBain, his projectionist Sprocket (Spence) and his publicist Lisa (Coustas) are forced to improvise voice-overs for the entire film with hilarious results. Kent (Carman) also attends the screening, hoping to see it fail. As he realises that the crowd is enjoying the film, he storms up to the projection box. He and McBain fight just as the film reaches its climax; McBain breaks the fourth wall several times so that the fight in the projection box corresponds with the fight on the screen. Kent is knocked out, and the film is a huge success.

Cast
 David Argue as Brad McBain
 Michael Carman as Sir Michael Kent
 Mary Coustas as Lisa
 Bruce Spence as Sprocket
 Voice of Des Mangan as Hercules, Samson, Machismo, Ursus, Testiculi
 Voice of Sally Patience as Labia, Muriel, Fanny, Delilah
 Voice of Matthew King as Charlie
 Frank Thring as the voice of Zeus

Background
Hercules Returns is a screen adaptation of the popular Australian live comedy show Double Take, conceived and performed by Des Mangan with Sally Patience. The Double Take show, which began in Sydney in 1986, is part of the "dub parody" genre, in which ostensibly serious films are deliberately re-voiced in a satirical or spoof manner. Well-known examples of this genre include the 1960s Jay Ward TV series Fractured Flickers and Woody Allen's What's Up, Tiger Lily? (1966). The Double Take concept is similar to the Los Angeles-based club show (later transferred to TV) Mad Movies with the L.A. Connection, which was popular in the US in the 1970s and 1980s, and the long-running Dynasty Dub series found on YouTube.

Double Take was very similar in style to (and may have been partly inspired by) two sketches that featured under the banner "Europa Productions" in the popular Australian TV comedy series The Aunty Jack Show (1972–73). In these pre-recorded sketches the Aunty Jack team satirically re-voiced an Italian Hercules film (renamed "Herco the Magnificent") and the 1952 Robert Newton swashbuckler Blackbeard the Pirate (renamed "Gidget Goes Tasmanian"). Like these TV sketches, Double Take performances featured distinctly Australian voicings (often with exaggerated "Ocker" and ethnic Australian accents) and many local humorous references, but unlike the L.A. Connection shows – which often used heavily edited versions and excerpts of films – the films that the Double Take team sent up were presented in their entirety and the scripts were carefully tailored to follow the original sequencing of the movies.

Mangan and Patience gained a strong following around Australia with their Double Take shows, which were performed live in a cinema. Typically seated at the back of the auditorium, using microphones plugged into the cinema's sound system, the Double Take team performed live comedic voice-overs of movies such as the American B-grade sci-fi film The Astro-Zombies and the 1960s Italian low-budget 'Sword-and-sandal' epic Ercole, Sansone, Maciste e Ursus gli invincibili. Of necessity much of their voice-over performance was tightly scripted, but working live also allowed the team some scope to occasionally insert topical jokes and references.

The film version came about after businessman Phil Jaroslow saw a Double Take performance of Hercules Returns in Melbourne. He was so impressed that he purchased the rights to both the original Ercole film and Mangan's script, hired cinematographer and film maker David Parker to help write a story to wrap around the Double Take routine, and financed the project with his own funds. Although it was his first film as a producer and Parker's first as a director, the project came in on time and on budget at a cost of less than A$1 million, and shooting was completed in just eight days.

The lead actors who appeared on screen were well known to local audiences. Bruce Spence has been one of Australia's most prominent stage and screen actors since the early 1970s; Coustas was a member of the popular "Wogs Out of Work" team, where she created her Greek-Australian character "Effie", and she co-starred in the popular TV sitcom Acropolis Now; Argue was well known from his many live comedy, TV and film appearances. Director David Parker has had a long association with writer-director Nadia Tass and they have collaborated on many popular films including Malcolm. The film is also notable as the last screen credit for veteran actor Frank Thring (who performed the voice of Zeus) and there are also cameo appearances by Australian film critics David Stratton, Margaret Pomeranz and Ivan Hutchinson. Ironically, the 'real' stars of the film, Mangan and Patience, do not appear on screen and their voice-overs are in fact mimed by Argue, Spence and Coustas.

Box office
Hercules Returns grossed $318,788 at the box office in Australia.

Reception

While the Rotten Tomatoes approval rating is currently N/A, Hercules Returns received positive reviews from critics and audiences alike at the time of its release.

ARIA Music Awards
The ARIA Music Awards are a set of annual ceremonies presented by Australian Recording Industry Association (ARIA), which recognise excellence, innovation, and achievement across all genres of the music of Australia. They commenced in 1987.

! 
|-
| rowspan="2"| 1994 || Hercules Returns || ARIA Award for Best Comedy Release ||  || 
|-

See also
 Cinema of Australia

References

External links

Hercules Returns at the National Film and Sound Archive
 
Hercules Returns at Oz Movies

Australian adventure comedy films
1993 films
Films shot in Melbourne
Films about Heracles
1990s parody films
1990s adventure comedy films
1993 comedy films
1990s English-language films